Catlettsburg is an unincorporated community in Sevier County, Tennessee, United States. It is accessible via Tennessee State Route 66 and Tennessee State Route 338, north of downtown Sevierville and some of community has been annexed by the city.

Geography
Catlettsburg has a mean elevation of 886 feet (270 metres).

Schools
Catlettsburg Elementary serves the area, a part of the Sevier County, Tennessee school system.

References 

Unincorporated communities in Sevier County, Tennessee
Unincorporated communities in Tennessee